Spilonota prognathana is a species of moth of the family Tortricidae. It is found in China (Inner Mongolia), Japan and Russia.

References

Moths described in 1883
Eucosmini